Akbarabad-e Vaziri (also Romanized as Akbarābād-e Vazīrī; also known as Akbarābād) is a village in Esmaili Rural District, Esmaili District, Anbarabad County, Kerman Province, Iran. At the 2006 census, its population was 470, in 109 families.

References 

Populated places in Anbarabad County